Sona Ahmadli (born October 5, 1988 in Baku) is a wrestler from Azerbaijan.

External links
 
 bio on fila-wrestling.com

Living people
1988 births
Azerbaijani female sport wrestlers
World Wrestling Championships medalists
European Wrestling Champions
21st-century Azerbaijani women